Sturisomatichthys festivum is a species of armored catfish endemic to Venezuela where it is found in the Lake Maracaibo basin. The species grows to a length of  SL and is known to be a facultative air-breather.

References

Sturisoma
Fish of Venezuela
Endemic fauna of Venezuela
Fish described in 1942
Taxa named by George S. Myers